Luigi Settembrini was the lead ship of her class of two submarines built for the  (Royal Italian Navy) during the early 1930s. She played a minor role in the Spanish Civil War of 1936–1939 supporting the Spanish Nationalists.

Design and description
The Settembrini class was an improved and enlarged version of the preceding s. They displaced  surfaced and  submerged. Their crew numbered 56 officers and enlisted men.

For surface running, the boats were powered by two  diesel engines, each driving one propeller shaft. When submerged each propeller was driven by a  electric motor. They could reach  on the surface and  underwater.

The boats were armed with eight  torpedo tubes, four each in the bow and stern for which they carried a total of 12 torpedoes. They were also armed with a single  deck gun forward of the conning tower for combat on the surface. Their anti-aircraft armament consisted of two or four  machine guns.

Construction and career
Luigi Settembrini was launched by Cantieri navali Tosi di Taranto at their Taranto shipyard on 28 September 1930 and completed later that year. Luigi Settimbrini missed with her first torpedo, but the boat surfaced and fired a warning shot, which caused the freighter's crew to abandon ship. The submarine then fired a pair of torpedoes which sank the Soviet ship.

Notes

References

External links
 Luigi Settembrini Marina Militare website

Settembrini-class submarines
World War II submarines of Italy
1930 ships
Ships built by Cantieri navali Tosi di Taranto
Ships built in Taranto